Sibon (also Romanized as Sībon; also known as Sībon-e Bālā, Sībon-e ‘Olyā, and Sībūn) is a village in Khorgam Rural District, Khorgam District, Rudbar County, Gilan Province, Iran. At the 2006 census, its population was 428, in 130 families.

References 

Populated places in Rudbar County